Wala, or Langalanga, is  an Oceanic language spoken on Malaita, in the Solomon Islands.

References

Bibliography
 

Languages of the Solomon Islands
Malaita languages